John L Watson & The Hummelflugs were an English band, fronted by the African American singer, John L. Watson. After leaving the band, Watson would go on to front John L. Watson and the Web and later on The Odyssey Blues Band.

Discography
"Looking For Love" appeared on The File Series - The 60's File - Pye Records FILD 006 - (Various artists) - 1977
"I'll Make It Worth Your While" appeared on Doin' The Mod Volume Two - Jump And Dance - Castle Music CMRCD 97 - (Various artists) - 2001

Former personnel
John L. Watson: Vocals
Graham Jeffries: Guitar
Val Gwynne: Bass
Penny Kempster: Keyboards
Dennis Lammin: Saxophone
Jeff Lewington: Guitar
Andy Maguire: Bass
Paul Maguire: Keyboards and saxophone
Duncan McCracken: Drums

References

English musical groups